Margown Rural District is a rural district (dehestan) in Margown District, Boyer-Ahmad County, Kohgiluyeh and Boyer-Ahmad Province, Iran. At the 2006 census, its population was 9,440, in 1,771 families. The rural district has 98 villages.

References 

Rural Districts of Kohgiluyeh and Boyer-Ahmad Province
Boyer-Ahmad County